The Holt government was the federal executive government of Australia led by Prime Minister Harold Holt. It was made up of members of a Liberal-Country Party coalition in the Australian Parliament from 26 January 1966 to 19 December 1967.

Background 
The Liberal Party of Australia-Country Party of Australia coalition had governed in Australia since 1949 under Prime Minister Robert Menzies. Menzies retired in January 1966 and the Liberal Party elected Harold Holt as party leader and he became Prime Minister of Australia.

Terms in office 

After being elected by the Parliamentary Liberal Party to serve as leader and prime minister, Harold Holt led the coalition to victory in the November 1966 Australian Federal Election against the Australian Labor Party opposition led by Arthur Calwell. The coalition won a substantial majority – the Liberals winning 61 seats and the Country Party 21 – with the Labor Party winning 41 and 1 Independent in the Australian House of Representatives (representing the largest parliamentary majority in 65 years). Following the 1966 election, Gough Whitlam replaced Arthur Calwell as Leader of the Opposition.

During his time in office, Holt increased Australian commitment to the growing War in Vietnam. His government oversaw conversion to decimal currency. Holt faced Britain's withdrawal from Asia by visiting and hosting many Asian leaders and by expanding ties to the United States, hosting the first visit to Australia by an American president, his friend Lyndon Johnson. Holt's government introduced the Migration Act 1966, which effectively dismantled the White Australia Policy and increased access to non-European migrants, including refugees fleeing the Vietnam War. Holt also called the 1967 Referendum which removed the discriminatory clause in the Australian Constitution which excluded Aboriginal Australians from being counted in the census – the referendum was one of the few to be overwhelmingly endorsed by the Australian electorate (over 90% voted 'yes'). By the end of 1967, the Liberals' initially popular support for the war in Vietnam was causing increasing public protest.

Death of Holt 

On 17 December 1967, Holt disappeared in heavy surf while swimming off Cheviot Beach, near Melbourne, becoming the third Australian prime minister to die in office. He was not formally declared missing until 19 December. Country Party leader John McEwen served as prime minister from 19 December 1967 to 10 January 1968, pending the election of a new leader of the Liberal Party of Australia. McEwen ruled out maintaining the coalition if deputy liberal leader William McMahon became prime minister. John Gorton won the leadership election with a small majority and resigned from the Senate to stand for election to Higgins, the House of Representatives seat formerly held by Harold Holt, which he achieved on 24 February 1968.

See also 
History of Australia
History of Australia since 1945
First Holt Ministry
Second Holt Ministry

References 

Holt
Liberal Party of Australia
History of Australia (1945–present)
1966 establishments in Australia
1967 disestablishments in Australia
Articles containing video clips